John F. Zulberti (January 20, 1967 – August 1, 2021) was an American four-time All-American NCAA lacrosse player at Syracuse University from 1986 to 1989. The Orange won the NCAA Men's Lacrosse Championships in 1988 and 1989 with Zulberti teaming up with perennial all-timers Gary Gait, Paul Gait, and Tom Marechek. He drowned at the age of 54 in August 2021.

Syracuse Orange
In the 1988 championship, Zulberti teamed with high scoring teammates the Gait brothers and Tom Marechek to lead the Orange to a 13-8 win over Cornell. These same four offensive leaders again teamed up to win the 1989 championship 13 to 12 over Johns Hopkins.

Zulberti was named the Jack Turnbull Award winner as the nation's top attackman in 1988 and 1989. He is among the all-time leaders in NCAA scoring, is 6th all-time on the Syracuse scoring list, and even ranks among the all-time point getters in New York Public School history.

MILL
John played professionally in the Major Indoor Lacrosse League for the Buffalo Bandits, playing in their inaugural season of 1992 and again teaming with Marechek to win a championship.

West Genesee
Like fellow Syracuse alum Brad Kotz, Zulberti played high school lacrosse at powerful West Genesee High School, where he had 361  career points. In his junior and senior years at West Genesee, Zulberti had 129 and 139 points, respectively.

Syracuse University

(a) 12th in NCAA Men's Division I all-time Assists
(b) 19th in NCAA Men's Division I all-time Total Points

See also
1988 NCAA Division I Men's Lacrosse Championship
1989 NCAA Division I Men's Lacrosse Championship
Syracuse athletes
Syracuse Orange men's lacrosse
NCAA Men's Division I Lacrosse Records

References

External links
Syracuse Media Guide
Syracuse Men's Lacrosse 1989 Statistics
Syracuse Men's Lacrosse 1987 Statistics
Syracuse Men's Lacrosse 1986 Statistics
West Genesee Wildcat Lacrosse
New York Public Lacrosse records

1967 births
2021 deaths
American lacrosse players
Syracuse Orange men's lacrosse players
Buffalo Bandits players
Deaths by drowning in the United States
Accidental deaths in Georgia (U.S. state)